The Old Aeroplane Company is an aviation company based in Tyabb, Victoria. Located at Tyabb Airport, it is owned by Judy Pay. It has a collection of antique aircraft on display and works on aviation restoration and maintenance.

The company's collection of aircraft include: a Curtiss P-40 Kittyhawk, a North American P-51 Mustang, North American T-28 Trojan, Harvard, de Havilland Vampire and a de Havilland Tiger Moth. Airframes under restoration include a second de Havilland Vampire, a Fiesler Storch and a Piper Cub Cruiser.

References

External links
 Photo gallery

Aerospace museums in Australia
Military and war museums in Australia